The Governor of Southern Rhodesia was the representative of the British monarch in the self-governing colony of Southern Rhodesia from 1923 to 1980. The Governor was appointed by The Crown and acted as the local head of state, receiving instructions from the British Government.

Rhodesia's 1965 Unilateral Declaration of Independence resulted in the Rhodesian government ceasing to recognise the authority of the Governor, and the 1969 Rhodesian constitutional referendum resulted in Rhodesia declaring itself a republic, independent from the British monarchy. Britain still considered the territory its colony and continued to maintain the office, albeit allowing it be vacant from 1969–1979. Following the Lancaster House Agreement the office was filled from December 1979 until April 1980 whereupon Britain formally recognised the territory as the independent republic of Zimbabwe, and the office of Governor was thereafter abolished.

Constitutional role
The Governor was also Commander-in-Chief of the armed forces and as such, in theory at least, exercised considerable influence over the running of the colony and its government, but in practice, the Governor's main function was to maintain a satisfactory relationship between the British and Southern Rhodesian Governments and acted in an advisory capacity most of the time. From 1951, however, in contrast to other colonies, the British government was represented in Southern Rhodesia by a High Commissioner in Salisbury (now Harare).

When Southern Rhodesia was part of the Federation of Rhodesia and Nyasaland, the position of the Governor remained unchanged, but as Salisbury became the capital of the Federation, the Governor General resided at Government House, previously the Governor's official residence. During this time, the Governor of Southern Rhodesia resided at Governor's Lodge in the suburb of Highlands.

UDI
Following the Unilateral Declaration of Independence in 1965, the government of Ian Smith ceased to recognise the authority of the then Governor, Sir Humphrey Gibbs, and appointed Clifford Dupont to exercise the Governor's powers as Officer Administering the Government.

However, Gibbs continued to occupy Government House, asserting his position as the Queen's de jure representative, and did not resign from the post until June 1969, following the decision of white voters in a referendum to approve a new constitution declaring Rhodesia, as Southern Rhodesia had become more commonly known, a republic.

In 1977, Field Marshal The Lord Carver was designated Resident Commissioner for Rhodesia, but he resigned fourteen months later.

The office of Governor remained vacant until 11 December 1979, when Lord Soames assumed the post, following the signing of the Lancaster House Agreement, under which Southern Rhodesia would achieve de jure independence as Zimbabwe on 18 April 1980.

Flag

In common with most other British colonies, the flag used by the Governor, as the Sovereign's representative in Southern Rhodesia, was initially a Union Flag with a white roundel in the centre, charged with the shield from the colony's arms granted on 11 August 1924. Unique among the flags of the Governors of British colonies, this shield of Arms was not surrounded by the customary wreath. This flag was adopted on 1 October 1924 and was flown until 30 July 1951.

On 31 July 1951, a new flag was put into use for the Governor of Southern Rhodesia. This was dark blue and charged in the centre with a Royal Crown, its height being four-sevenths of the hoist. Initially the Tudor Crown would have been used, but after her accession to the throne in 1952, Elizabeth II indicated her preference for St Edward's Crown, and this version would have been used thereafter. Although the colony had attained 'Responsible Government' in 1923, it was never a fully fledged Dominion, and so did not have a Governor-General, whose flag in other Dominions would be dark blue, charged in the centre with the Royal Crest above a Crown, with the name of the Dominion written in a yellow scroll below.

List of governors of Southern Rhodesia

For continuation after independence, see: President of Zimbabwe

See also
President of Rhodesia
Prime Minister of Rhodesia
President of Zimbabwe
Prime Minister of Zimbabwe
Governor-General of the Federation of Rhodesia and Nyasaland

Notes

References

Rhodesia, Southern
 
Governor
Governors
Zimbabwe and the Commonwealth of Nations
1923 establishments in Southern Rhodesia
1980 disestablishments in Zimbabwe